Mesobia is a genus of very small freshwater snails, aquatic gastropod mollusks in the family Cochliopidae.

Species
Species within the genus Mesobia include:
Mesobia pristina Thompson & Hershler, 1991

References

Cochliopidae